pfs:Write was a word processor created by Software Publishing Corporation (SPC) and published in 1983. It was released for IBM PC compatibles and the Apple II. It includes the features common to most word processors of the day, including word wrapping, spell checking, copy and paste, underlining, and boldfacing; and it also a few advanced features, such as mail merge and few others.  The product was considerably easier to both learn and use than its more fully featured and expensive competitors: WordPerfect, Microsoft Word, and XyWrite.

History
pfs:Write was announced in 1983 and it was part of a family of products released by SPC under the "pfs:" brand (Personal Filing System) which, when installed onto the same computer, combined to form a sort of office suite which included companion products pfs:File in 1980 (a database), pfs:Plan (a spreadsheet), pfs:Report in 1981 (reporting software), and pfs:Graph in 1982 (business graphics software).  Other, mostly utilitarian products bearing the "pfs:" brand subsequently emerged, including pfs:Access (for data communications), pfs:Easy Start (a menuing utility), and pfs:Proof (a proofreading utility).  Eventually, SPC offered a low- to mid-level desktop publishing product called pfs:Publisher; and it packaged the core word processing, database and spreadsheet products into a suite named pfs:Office.

A Windows 3.0 version, called Professional Write Plus 1.0, was released in 1991.

The last version, Professional Write 3.0 for DOS, was released in 1994.

A Windows Version was available to registered users of PW 3.0.

Lotus 1-2-3 integration
The market dominance of Lotus 1-2-3 encouraged SPC to allow its integration with pfs:Write. A user could use pfs:Write for word processing and link to Lotus 1-2-3 for spreadsheet use through the pfs menu system. Some setup was required, but as Lotus was deficient in word processing, this proved popular, especially among users already devoted to 1-2-3.

Reception
Byte in 1984 described pfs:Write 1.1 as "an elementary program for users who don't have time to major in word processing or who have basic needs". It cited "major deficiencies", however, including the inability to easily justify or delete text, poor printed and built-in documentation, and very slow file saves. II Computing listed it fourth on the magazine's list of top Apple II non-game, non-educational software as of late 1985, based on sales and market-share data.

References

Proprietary software
DOS word processors
Windows word processors
1983 software